Ilia Malinin (born December 2, 2004) is an American figure skater. He is the 2022-23 Grand Prix Final bronze medalist, the 2022 Skate America champion, the 2022 Grand Prix of Espoo champion, the 2022 CS U.S. Classic champion, 2021 CS Cup of Austria bronze medalist, the 2023 U.S. national champion, and the 2022 U.S. national silver medalist.  

On the junior level, Malinin is the 2022 World Junior champion, 2021 JGP France I champion, and 2021 JGP Austria champion. He currently holds the world junior record for the men's short program, free skate, and combined score.

Malinin is the first and only skater to land a quadruple Axel, widely regarded as the hardest jump in figure skating, as well as the first to land a fully rotated one in international competition. He accomplished this feat at his first attempt at the 2022 CS U.S. Classic, and repeated the feat for his senior Grand Prix debut one month later at Skate America.

In September 2022, he was named to Time Magazine's Time100 Next List of emerging leaders from around the world who are shaping the future and defining the next generation of leadership.

Personal life 
Malinin was born on December 2, 2004, in Fairfax, Virginia. He is the son of Russian-born Uzbekistani singles skaters Tatiana Malinina (1999 Grand Prix Final and Four Continents champion) and Roman Skorniakov, and has a younger sister named Liza, born in 2014. Malinin took the Russian masculine form of his mother's surname due to his parents' concerns that his father's surname would be too difficult to pronounce. He is fluent in Russian and English. Malinin attends George C. Marshall High School and is due to graduate in 2023.

Malinin admires his mother's skating, as well as Evgeni Plushenko, Nathan Chen, and Mikhail Kolyada. He also looks up to Yuzuru Hanyu.

Career

Early career 
Malinin began skating in 2010 under the tutelage of his parents, who were both Olympic skaters for Uzbekistan. He is the 2016 U.S. national juvenile champion, the 2017 U.S. national intermediate champion, and the 2019 U.S. national novice bronze medalist; he did not qualify for the 2018 U.S. Championships. Internationally on the advanced novice level, Malinin is the 2018 Asian Open Trophy champion and the 2018 Golden Bear silver medalist.

Junior career

2019–2020 season: Junior international debut 
Malinin made his junior international debut at the Philadelphia Summer International, winning gold ahead of U.S. teammate Nicholas Hsieh and Darian Kaptich of Australia. On the 2019–20 ISU Junior Grand Prix, he placed fourth at JGP United States and seventh at JGP Italy. Malinin was unable to compete at the 2020 U.S. Championships due to injury but was awarded a berth to the 2020 World Junior Championships based on his early season results. At the World Junior Championships, he was 13th in the short program and 18th in the free skating to finish 16th overall.

2020–2021 season: New quads & injuries 
Due to the COVID-19 pandemic, the 2020–21 ISU Junior Grand Prix, where Malinin would have competed, was canceled. He was instead invited to 2020 Skate America after the Grand Prix series was converted to semi-domestic events. Malinin placed a surprise fifth at Skate America after unveiling two new quadruple jumps – toe loop and Salchow – that he learned during lockdown. As a result of his placement, he was invited to participate in the Las Vegas Invitational, where he helped Team Tara defeat Team Johnny. Malinin was unable to compete at the 2021 U.S. Championships after missing the qualifying competition due to an ankle injury.

2021–2022 season: Junior world title & senior national debut 
With the resumption of the Junior Grand Prix, Malinin returned to international competition at the first edition of the 2021 JGP France in Courchevel, winning the gold medal despite making errors on both of his attempted quadruple jumps in the free skate. He called it "a struggle since I haven’t competed in a year, but I think now that I’m back, things are starting going back to normal." At his second event, the 2021 JGP Austria in Linz, Malinin entered as one of the favorites for the gold medal and won with new personal bests in all segments. He landed a quad Salchow successfully in the free skate while making an error on his quad toe loop attempt. With two gold medals, he qualified to the Junior Grand Prix Final. However, the Final would later be canceled due to travel restrictions prompted by the Omicron variant.

Returning to the senior level at the 2021 CS Cup of Austria in November, he placed thirteenth in the short program but rallied with a second-place free skate to take the bronze medal.

Competing at the 2022 U.S. Championships with hopes of making the American Olympic team, Malinin placed third in the short program. Second in the free skate with four quadruple jumps landed, Malinin won the silver medal, a result he said surprised him: "I definitely wasn’t expecting to skate this good and especially place second." Malinin's placement resulted that, per qualification criteria, the third berth on the Olympic team was to be decided between him and 4th place Jason Brown. Ultimately the committee chose the veteran Brown, a result that attracted some controversy. Malinin was instead assigned to make his World Championship debut later in the year. Brown praised him, saying, "U.S. figure skating is so lucky to have such a bright future with Ilia."

In advance of the 2022 World Championships, Malinin was sent to the International Challenge Cup to secure the required technical minimum scores. He was successful in this, winning the gold medal in the process. Competing at the World Championships in Montpellier, the men's field was considerably more open than usual due to the absences of Nathan Chen and Yuzuru Hanyu and the International Skating Union banning all Russian athletes due to their country's invasion of Ukraine. Malinin finished fourth in the short program with a personal best of 100.16, exceeding his previous best international score by almost twenty points. He sat only 0.96 points behind third-place Kazuki Tomono. In the free skate, he made major errors on two quadruple jump attempts, both of which were downgraded and dropped to ninth overall. He spoke afterward of there having been "more pressure on myself, just wanting to skate good so badly, and it kind of didn't work out."

Malinin finished the season at the 2022 World Junior Championships, which due to Bulgarian pandemic measures, was delayed from early March to mid-April and relocated from Sofia to Tallinn. He entered the event as the heavy favorite for the gold medal based on a strong season. In the short program, he skated cleanly and set a new junior world record of 88.99. He won the free skate as well, setting junior world records for that segment and for total score, taking the gold medal by a margin of almost 42 points over silver medalist Mikhail Shaidorov.

Senior career

2022–2023 season: Senior international debut 
Malinin opened his season at the 2022 CS U.S. Classic. He placed sixth place in his short program. His free skate, which was set to the Euphoria soundtrack and was choreographed by Shae-Lynn Bourne, consisted of five quad jumps, including a quad Axel, his first jump during the program, which made him the first skater to land the jump in an international competition. American figure skater Adam Rippon called Malinin's accomplishment "the craziest thing I’ve ever seen anyone do on the ice.” The judges awarded Malinin's quad Axel with a grade of execution of 1.0. His free skate also included a triple Lutz-triple Axel combination as the last jumping pass. He fell attempting a quad Lutz but successfully completed all his other jumps. He came in first place in the free skate, earning a total of 257.28 points, coming in first place overall. Kévin Aymoz from France came in second place with 236.17 points, and fellow American Camden Pulkinen came in third place with 219.49 points. His achievement earned him a place on the Time 100 Next list for 2022. 

At the Japan Open as part of Team North America, Malinin placed first in the men's free skate competition, earning a total of 193.80 points behind world champion Shoma Uno , while his team as a whole finished second to the host country Japan. He touched the ice on the final rotation of his quad Axel, so he was not able to land it successfully even though he accomplished it during practice, but "effortlessly" completed all four of his other quad jumps.

Returning to the senior Grand Prix at the 2022 Skate America in Norwood, Massachusetts, Malinin fell on his quad toe jump but earned 86.08 points in his short program, which put him in fourth place. During his free skating program, he fell on a quad Lutz-triple Salchow combination, both parts of which were called as underrotated, but successfully landed four "solid" quad jumps, including a "beautiful" and "nearly perfectly" executed quad Axel jump, the first jump of the program, which earned him many positive GOEs. He also completed a quad toe loop, a quad Lutz and a quad Salchow in the first half of the program. After his error on the lutz combination in the second half, The Associated Press reported that "with an almost sheepish smile", he got back up from the ice and completed a triple flip-triple toe loop and a triple Lutz-triple Axel, which earned him a standing ovation from the audience. His spins were all level-4. He earned 194.29 points in his free skate, with a total score of 280.37, seven points more than the second-place finisher Kao Miura from Japan, putting him in first place overall. He was the youngest Skate America men's champion in the event's history. At his second event, the 2022 Grand Prix of Espoo, Malinin underrotated two of his jumps and stumbled out of his triple Axel, as a result placing second in that segment behind France's Kévin Aymoz. He revealed afterward that he was "a little bit injured" with a problem in his left foot. He won the free skate decisively, moving into first place and taking his second gold medal. These results qualified him to the Grand Prix Final.

At the Final in Torino, Malinin stepped out of two jumps and slightly underrotated a third, as a result placing fifth in that segment with a score of 80.10, well back of the leaders. He indicated that he remained bothered by his injury and would not attempt the quad Lutz in competition. He rebounded in the free skate, finishing in second place in that segment, with only a small error on one slightly underrotated jump. He rose to the bronze medal overall, 2.41 points behind silver medalist Sōta Yamamoto of Japan. Malinin said his "goal is to definitely make sure that I'm able to be comfortable with my short program because, as of right now, it's been a bit messy."

Malinin entered the 2023 U.S. Championships as the gold medal favourite, and, after a season of difficulties in the short program, delivered a clean performance to rank first in the segment by 10.11 points over Jason Brown. He acknowledged afterward that "this season all the short programs have been really tough, and I think that we took every single one of them and thought about where we need to work and what to improve" to get to that performance. Malinin planned to attempt six quadruple jumps in his free skate, but fell on one and doubled two others. He placed second in that segment, behind Andrew Torgashev and only narrowly ahead of Brown, but won the gold medal on the strength of his short program showing.

Honors and awards 

 Named to Time Magazine's 2022 Time100 Next list

Records and achievements

Junior world record scores 
Malinin has set the junior world record scores three times under the current ISU judging system – once in each three categories.

Programs

Competitive highlights 
GP: Grand Prix; CS: Challenger Series; JGP: ISU Junior Grand Prix. Pewter medals (4th place) awarded only at U.S. national, sectional, and regional events.

Pre-international debut

Detailed results 
ISU Personal best in bold. Current ISU world bests highlighted in bold and italic.

Senior results

Junior results

References

External links 
 
 Ilia Malinin at U.S. Figure Skating
 

! colspan="3" style="border-top: 5px solid #78FF78;" |World Junior Record Holders

2004 births
Living people
American male single skaters
American people of Russian descent
Sportspeople from Fairfax, Virginia
World Junior Figure Skating Championships medalists